Radhika Gajjala (born December 22, 1960, in Bombay) is a communications and a cultural studies professor, who has been named a Fulbright scholar twice.

Early life 
Radhika Gajjala was born December 22, 1960, in Bombay (Mumbai), India. She then moved around with her family before attending college in Hyderabad, India, eventually settling down in Bowling Green, Ohio, in 1997.

Career 
Gajjala is a well known communications scholar, co-editor of Ada  a journal focusing on gender, new media, and technology, and professor of both media and communication, and culture studies at Bowling Green State University. She has authored and co-authored several scholarly articles and books, with her most recent book being Cyberculture and the Subaltern: Weavings of the Virtual and Real.

Education 
In 1982, she attended Nizam’s College, Osmania in Hyderabad, India, where she received her Bachelor of Arts in English literature, political science and economics. She then received her Masters in Corporate Communication from Duquesne University in Pittsburgh, Pennsylvania. After that she studied at the University of Pittsburgh and received her Ph.D. in media studies. Finally, she moved to Bowling Green, Ohio, where she started her career as a professor.

Scholarly works 
Gajjala’s main interests are digital media and how it affects globalization, gender, and race and technology. Gajjala also focuses on how these topics are affected and influenced by the digital world.

Books 
 Gajjala, R. (2004). Cyber selves: Feminist Ethnographies of South Asian women. Walnut Creek: Altamira Press. [1,003,595 paid on Kindle; 1,031,555 in Books – Jan 23, 2011]. 
 Gajjala, R., & Gajjala, V. (Eds.). (2008). South-Asian Technospaces. New York: Peter Lang, Digital Formation Series.  
 Blair, K., Gajjala, R., & Tulley, C. (Eds.). (2009). Webbing Cyberfeminist Practice: Communities, Pedagogies, and Social Action. New Jersey: Hampton Press.  
 Chopra R. & Gajjala R., (Eds.). (2011) Global Media Cultures, and Identities. Routledge. 
 Gajjala R. & Yeon Ju Oh (Eds.). (2012) Cyberfeminism 2.0. Peter Lang, Digital Formation Series edited by Steve Jones. 
 Gajjala, R. (2012). Cyberculture and the Subaltern: Weavings of the Virtual and Real. Lexington Press.

Journal articles 
 Gajjala, R (2015) When Your Seams Get Undone, Do You Learn to Sew or to Kill Monsters? The Communication Review.  
 Zhang, Y., Gajjala, R., and Watkins, S. (2012). Home of Hope: Voicings, whiteness, and technological gaze. Journal of Communication Inquiry, 36(3), 202-221. 
 Gajjala R and Birzescu A. (2011) Digital Imperialism through Online social/financial networks – for Special issue of Economic and Political Weekly (Edited by Rohit Chopra and Aniket Alam) 
 Gajjala, R. (2011). Snapshots from sari Trails: Cyborgs Old and New, Social Identities, 17, 393-408. 
 Gajjala, V., Gajjala, R., Birzescu, A., and Anarbaeva, S. (2011). Microfinance in Online Space: A Visual Analysis of Kiva.org. Development in Practice, 21, 880893.  
 Gajjala, R.,  Zhang, Y., and Dako-Gyeke, P. (2010). Lexicons of Women’s Empowerment Online. Feminist Media Studies, Vol. 10(1): 69 -86.  
 Gajjala, R. and Rybas, N. (2008). Racing and Queering the Interface: Producing  global/local cyberselves. Qualitative Inquiry, Special Issue on Technology, 14, 1110-1133.  
 Rybas, N., & Gajjala, R. (2007). Developing cyberethnographic research methods for  understanding digitally mediated identities. Forum: Qualitative Social Research, 8(3). 
 Gajjala, R. (2003). South Asian digital diasporas and cyberfeminist webs: negotiating globalization, nation, gender and information technology design. Contemporary South Asia, 12 (1), 41-56  
 Gajjala, R., & Mamidipudi, A. (2002). Gendering processes within technological environments: A cyberfeminist issue. Rhizomes: Cultural Studies in Emerging Knowledge, 4. http://www.rhizomes.net 
 Gajjala, R. (2000). Internet constructs of identity and ignorance: “Third-world” contexts and cyberfeminism. In G. Pagnucci & N. Mauriello (Eds.), (1999-2000). The future of narrative discourse: Internet constructs of literacy and identity: Vol. 17/18. Works  and Days (pp. 33–36).  
 Gajjala, R., & Mamidipudi, A. (1999). Cyberfeminism, technology and international “development.” Gender and Development, 17 (2), 8-16.

Awards and honors 
Gajjala is a two time Fulbright scholar. She was first awarded the scholarship in 2011 as a part of the general U.S. Scholars program at Soegijapranata Catholic University in Semarang, Indonesia. While there she taught classes, conducted workshops on gender, globalization and digital media, and did field research with gamers and youth cultures. She was then awarded the scholarship again in 2015 as part of the Core Fulbright U.S. Scholar Program specializing in communication at the University of Bergen in Bergen, Norway. Her project in Norway was titled Rupturing Digital Fabrics, Unpacking Global and Local Hierarchies: Developing Method for Postcolonial Digital Humanities.

Further reading 
 Chopra, R., & Gajjala, R. (2011). Global Media, Culture, and Identity: Theory, Cases, and Approaches (1st ed.). New York: Taylor & Francis.
 Gajjala, R. (2004). Cyber Selves: Feminist Autoethnographies of South Asian Women. Walnut Creek, CA: AltaMira Press,U.S. 
 Gajjala, R. (2008). Webbing Cyberfeminist Practice: Communities, Pedagogies, and Social Action. United States: Hampton Press.
 Gajjala, R. (2012). Cyberculture and the Subaltern: Weavings of the Virtual and Real. Lanham, MD, United States: Rowman & Littlefield Pub. 
 Gajjala, R. (2015). When your seams get undone, do you learn to sew or to kill monsters? The Communication Review, 18(1), 23–36. doi:10.1080/10714421.2015.996411

See also 
 Cyberfeminism

References 

1960 births
Living people
Bowling Green State University faculty
Fulbright alumni